Anthony Walton may refer to:
 Anthony Walton (politician) (born 1962), former New Zealand political party president
 Anthony Walton (poet) (born 1960), American poet and writer
 Tony Walton (born 1934), English set and costume designer